Joseph A. Tauriello (April 3, 1934 – November 17, 2009) was an American politician who served as a member of the New York State Senate.

Early life and education
Tauriello was born on April 3, 1934, in Buffalo, New York, the son of Frank J. Tauriello and Margaret L. Tauriello. His uncle, Anthony F. Tauriello, served for one term in the United States House of Representatives. He attended Grover Cleveland High School and the University at Buffalo.

Career 
In 1958, he joined the Buffalo Fire Department and became an arson investigator.

He entered politics as a Democrat. He was a member of the Board of Supervisors of Erie County in 1966 and 1967; and a member of the Erie County Legislature from 1968 to 1973.

He was a member of the New York State Senate from 1974 to 1980, sitting in the 180th, 181st, 182nd and 183rd New York State Legislatures. In 1980, he was appointed to the New York State Workers' Compensation Board.

Death 
He died on November 17, 2009 at in Elderwood Senior Care in Cheektowaga, New York. He was buried at the Mount Calvary Cemetery there.

References

External links

1934 births
2009 deaths
Politicians from Buffalo, New York
Democratic Party New York (state) state senators
County legislators in New York (state)
University at Buffalo alumni
20th-century American politicians